The Pitchfork Music Festival 2013 was held on July 19 to 21, 2013 at the Union Park, Chicago, United States. The festival was headlined by Björk, R. Kelly and Belle and Sebastian.

Lineup
Headline performers are listed in boldface. Artists listed from latest to earliest set times.

Notes

References

External links

Pitchfork Music Festival
2013 music festivals